DTN or DtN may refer to:
 Daniel Tiger's Neighborhood
 Delay-tolerant networking, or Disruption-tolerant networking, an approach to computer network architecture
 DTN (company), provider of specialized news services with data from financial markets, weather, etc.
 Decision Theater North, an immersive visualization space for complex decision making in Fairbanks, Alaska
 Down to Nothing, a straight-edge hardcore band from Richmond, Virginia
 Dorsal tegmental nucleus, a brain region
 Dictius Te Necare (Latin: "You must kill yourself") a 1996 album by German black metal band Bethlehem
 Daystar Television Network, an evangelical Christian television broadcaster
 the IATA airport code for Shreveport Downtown Airport in Shreveport, Louisiana

 the UK railway station code for Denton railway station in Denton, Greater Manchester
 the term downtown